Tar may refer to:
 Tar, Isfahan (طار - Ţār)